Henry Bryan Hall (11 May 1808 London – 25 April 1884 Morrisania, New York), was an English stipple engraver and portrait painter.  
He was apprenticed to the engravers Benjamin Smith and Henry Meyer. Later he worked for Henry Thomas Ryall who was designated 'Portrait and Historical Engraver to Her Majesty, Queen Victoria'. Hall produced plates for Ryall's Eminent Conservative Statesmen (1837–38) and assisted in the engraving of seventy portraits for Ryall's plate of The Coronation of Queen Victoria after George Hayter (1838–42). Hall also engraved portraits of English Protestant martyrs for C. Birch (1839) and provided plates for John Wilson and Robert Chambers's The Land of Burns (1840), Finden's Gallery of Beauty (1841), John William Carleton's Sporting Sketch-Book (1842), and John Kitto's Gallery of Scripture Engravings (1846–49).

After settling in New York in 1850, he founded the firm of H. B. Hall and Sons, which grew into a flourishing practice,  engraving and publishing portraits. He produced images of celebrities from American colonial and revolutionary history for a private club in New York and for Philadelphia collectors. Hall's talents extended to portrait painting, especially in ivory miniatures work. He had painted Napoleon III while still in London, and, after moving to America, painted portraits of the artists Thomas Sully and Charles Loring Elliott.

Henry Bryan Hall and Mary A. Denison had four sons and four daughters. Alfred, Alice, Charles, and Henry were accomplished engravers - of these, Henry Bryan Hall Jr. (fl. 1855-1900) fought in the American Civil War and enjoyed renown for his engraved portraits of its leading figures. Attributing engravings depicting American military and political celebrities to the father or son may be difficult.

Bibliography
Engen, Rodney K. Dictionary of Victorian Engravers, Print Publishers and their Works (Cambridge: Chadwyck-Healey, c1979)
Fielding, Mantle. Dictionary of American Painters, Sculptors & Engravers, 2nd newly-rev., enl., and updated edn, ed. Glenn B. Opitz (Poughkeepsie, NY: Apollo, 1986)
Hunnisett, Basil. A Dictionary of British Steel Engravers (Leigh-on-Sea: F. Lewis, 1980)
Stauffer, David McNeely and Mantle Fielding. American Engravers upon Copper and Steel (New York: Franklin, 1964))

References

External links

 

1808 births
1884 deaths
English engravers